The Gates Family Foundation is one of the largest philanthropic organizations in Colorado, based in Denver.

Background
Founded in 1946, the Foundation currently has net assets of approximately $500 million. In 2007, the Foundation paid roughly $20 million in grants, all of which went to Colorado recipients.

The source of the original endowment is the Gates Rubber Company of Denver, Colorado.

The Foundation is well known in Denver, for example including the Gates Planetarium at the Denver Museum of Nature and Science.

In May 2022, The Gates Family Foundation announced a $200 million donation and collaboration project with the University of Colorado Anschutz. The Donation is to establish a medical research institute at the university’s Anschutz Medical Campus and is to be funded over five years by the Gates Family Foundation.

Assets and funding details
As of 2018 the Gates Family Foundation had assets of $361,589,256.

Funding details as of 2018:

References 

Organizations based in Denver